Mike Meade (born February 12, 1960) is a former running back in the National Football League.

Biography
Meade was born Michael Lee Meade on February 12, 1960, in Dover, Delaware.

Career
Meade was drafted by the Green Bay Packers in the fifth round of the 1982 NFL Draft and played two seasons with the team before playing two seasons with the Detroit Lions. He played at the collegiate level at Pennsylvania State University.

See also
List of Green Bay Packers players
List of Detroit Lions players

References

1960 births
Living people
People from Dover, Delaware
Green Bay Packers players
Detroit Lions players
American football running backs
Penn State Nittany Lions football players